Versolato is a surname. Notable people with the surname include:

Mateus Versolato Júnior (born 1983), Brazilian footballer
Ocimar Versolato (1961–2017), Brazilian fashion designer